Hampstead Gardens is a north-eastern suburb of Adelaide, in the City of Port Adelaide Enfield. Triangular in shape, it is bounded by Muller Road to the north, which meets North East Road which is the boundary to the south and east and then Ways Road which is its western boundary.

The suburb contains many post World War II character homes on large blocks, predominantly on Ways Road and on the North East Road portion of the suburb. A trademark of the suburb are the many streets lined with Jacaranda trees.

Due to the suburb's close proximity to the Adelaide CBD and affluent suburbs such as Collinswood, Vale Park and Walkerville, many older homes and Housing SA dwellings are being demolished to make way for newer courtyard homes.

The suburb has two small local strip shopping centres, one on Ways Road and the other on the corner of Muller Road and Poole Avenue, whilst the neighbourhood centre sized Hampstead Gardens Shopping Centre is located on North East Road just to the west of the Poole Avenue intersection.

See also
James Philcox, early land speculator who owned land in the area

References

Suburbs of Adelaide